Harriet Frank Jr. (born Harriet Goldstein; March 2, 1923 – January 28, 2020) was an American screenwriter and producer. Working with her husband Irving Ravetch, Frank received many awards during her career, including the New York Film Critics Circle Awards and the Writers Guild of America Award, and several nominations.

Frank began her writing career after World War II, under Metro-Goldwyn-Mayer's young writer's training program, where she first met her future husband. She married Ravetch in 1946 but worked independently for ten years, finally collaborating with him in 1957, a relationship that continued for the remainder of her career. During 33 years of collaboration, Frank and Ravetch created the screenplays for a variety of films, mainly adaptations of the works of American authors.

Frank and Ravetch maintained a close working relationship with director Martin Ritt, collaborating with him on eight film projects. After initially being suggested by Ravetch to direct The Long, Hot Summer (1958), Ritt eventually drew the couple out of inactivity on three occasions, hiring them to write the screenplays for Norma Rae (1979), Murphy's Romance (1985) and Stanley & Iris (1990). The last was both the last film directed by Ritt (who died later that year) and the last screenplay by Frank and Ravetch.

Frank has a primary focus in the memoir The Mighty Franks: A Memoir (2017), written by her nephew Michael Frank, an essayist and short-story writer.

Life and career

Early life

Harriet Frank Jr. was born and raised in Portland, Oregon, the daughter of Edith Frances (Bergman) and Sam Goldstein, a shoe store owner. Her mother changed the family name to Frank, and her own name to Harriet, making herself Harriet, Sr. and her daughter Harriet, Jr. In 1939, she relocated with her family to Los Angeles, where her mother worked as a Hollywood story editor; her father attended the University of California, Los Angeles (UCLA) at the same time as Irving Ravetch, her future husband. Having graduated at different times from UCLA, the two met in the Metro-Goldwyn-Mayer young writers' training program after World War II.

The couple married in 1946, but worked independently for over 10 years, with Frank writing for projects such as A Really Important Person (short, 1947), Whiplash (1948) and Run for Cover (1955). The couple first collaborated on the script of an adaptation of William Faulkner's novel The Hamlet, released as The Long, Hot Summer (1958), but Frank later said "in the end, we created mostly new material, so it wasn't really a true adaptation".

Collaborations 
Martin Ritt, having directed The Long, Hot Summer on suggestion by Ravetch, then directed the couple's next collaboration The Sound and the Fury (1959), again an adaptation of a William Faulkner novel. Frank and Ravetch collaborated on two films released in 1960, Home from the Hill, an adaptation of the novel of the same name, and The Dark at the Top of the Stairs, an adaptation of a Tony award-winning play.

Frank and Ravetch reunited with Martin Ritt to write the screenplay for Hud (1963), adapted from the novel Horseman, Pass By (1961) by Larry McMurtry. The film received positive reviews by the critics, with the couple sharing a New York Film Critics Circle Award for "Best Screenplay" and a Writers Guild of America Award (WGA Award) for Best Written American Drama. They were nominated for an Academy Award in the category of Best Writing, Screenplay Based on Material from Another Medium.

Frank worked alongside her husband and Ritt on Hombre (1967), a Revisionist Western based on the novel of the same name. The next year, Frank and Ravetch wrote the screenplay for House of Cards (1968, released in the U.S. the following year and directed by John Guillermin. For House of Cards, Frank was credited, together with her husband, under the pen name of James P. Bonner. Frank and Ravetch returned to the works of William Faulkner, writing the screenplay for a film adaptation of his last novel The Reivers (1969).

Frank and Ravetch wrote the screenplay for The Cowboys (1972), based on the novel of the same name, and The Carey Treatment (also 1972), based on the novel A Case of Need by Michael Crichton. For the latter, the couple were credited under James P. Bonner, the last time they adopted the pen name. The couple reunited with Martin Ritt to write the screenplay for Conrack (1974), based on the autobiographical book The Water Is Wide, with Frank also working as producer. The film was commercially and critically well-received, winning a BAFTA award. The couple wrote for an adaptation of the novel The Bank Robber, released as The Spikes Gang (also 1974). Around this time, Frank also wrote the novels Single: a novel (1977), and Special Effects (1979).

Later screenplays 

Frank and Ravetch next project, Norma Rae (1979), was another collaboration with director Martin Ritt. The film tells the story of a factory worker from the Southern United States who becomes involved in labour union activities. Unusually, for the couple, the film was based on a true story, that of Crystal Lee Jordan. It was arguably their best received film, winning numerous awards, including two Academy Awards.

Another six years passed before the couple's next filmed screenplay, this time for the romantic comedy Murphy's Romance (1985), based on a novel by Max Schott. They worked again with director Martin Ritt, their seventh project together, and with Sally Field, who played the titular lead role in Norma Rae. Despite Murphy's Romance being well-received (it was nominated for two Academy Awards), it was five years before another Frank and Ravetch screenplay was shot; hired by Martin Ritt, the couple wrote the screenplay for Stanley & Iris (1990), loosely based on the novel Union Street by British writer Pat Barker.

Death 
Frank Jr. died at her home in Los Angeles on January 28, 2020, at age 96.

Legacy 
Ten months after the release of Stanley & Iris, on December 8, 1990, Martin Ritt died. Together, the trio of Frank, Ravetch and Ritt had collaborated on eight films and achieved considerable successes. As well as being the last film for Ritt, Stanley & Iris marked the end of Frank and Ravetch's writing careers.

In a career spanning 43 years and 21 film productions, Harriet Frank Jr. won four awards and received many nominations, sharing them all with her husband. As well as with her husband and Martin Ritt, Frank collaborated extensively with actors such as Paul Newman, writing for three of his film appearances (The Long, Hot Summer, Hud, and Hombre).

Filmography

Awards and nominations

Notes

References 
 
 
 
 American Film Institute (AFI) (1997). The American Film Institute Catalog of Motion Pictures Produced in the United States. University of California Press. . Retrieved September 23, 2009.

External links 
 

1923 births
2020 deaths
American film producers
American women screenwriters
University of California, Los Angeles alumni
Writers Guild of America Award winners
Screenwriters from Oregon
American women film producers
Writers from Portland, Oregon
21st-century American women